Bhakla is an Indian Chhattisgarhi film, released on 5 May 2006. This film is notable because Lata Mangeshkar sang a song in this film, which was her first and last Chhattisgarhi song. The movie was directed by Dinesh Patel and written by Madan Sharma. The composer for his movie is Kalyan Sen, who is a notable music director in Chhattisgarh.

The film's title character, an innocent village boy, was played by Dhriti Pati Sarkar.

Cast 

 Dhiriti Pati Sharkar
 Dipak
 Dharmendra Chaubey
 Neetu Singh
 Anu Sharma
 Barkha
 Kalyan Sen
 Arvind Mishra
 Ashok Srivastav
 Narendra Kabara
 Mukesh Vaishnav
 Rajendra Kapoor
 Suresh Banafar
 Anil Sharma
 Kaushal Upadhyay
 Laxmi Sharma
 Upasana Vaishnava
 Inderjit Kaur
 Meenakshi
 Neha Rajput
 Priya Sharma
 Bhitu Bhelchand
 Suleiman
 Kamal
 Santosh
 Shiv Tamrakar
 Mahesh
 Madan Sharma

References

External links

Chhattisgarhi-language films
2006 films
Culture of Chhattisgarh
2000s Hindi-language films